The Districts of the Republic of Mauritius are the second-level administrative divisions after the Outer Islands of Mauritius.

Mauritius Island

Mauritius Island is divided into nine districts which consist of one city, four towns, and 130 villages. Its capital is Port Louis.

The Plaines Wilhems District consists mainly of four towns: Beau Bassin-Rose Hill, Curepipe, Quatre Bornes, and Vacoas-Phoenix. The other districts consist of different villages, some of which are further divided into suburbs. As of December 31, 2012, the urban population stood at 536,086 and the rural population was 718,925.

Autonomous region
Rodrigues used to be the tenth district of Mauritius. The island gained autonomy in 2002, its capital is Port Mathurin.

Dependencies of Mauritius
 Agaléga.
 Saint Brandon

The capital of Agaléga is Vingt-Cinq.

Saint Brandon is sparsely populated, its main settlement is Île Raphael (pop. 40).

See also

 ISO 3166-2:MU
 List of places in Mauritius
 Outer Islands of Mauritius

References

 
Subdivisions of Mauritius
Mauritius, Districts and dependencies
Mauritius 2
Districts, Mauritius
Mauritius geography-related lists